Poplar was a parliamentary constituency centred on the Poplar district of the East End of London.  It returned one Member of Parliament (MP)  to the House of Commons of the Parliament of the United Kingdom.

History
The constituency was created for the 1885 general election, and abolished for the 1918 general election, when with very minor boundary changes it was replaced by the new constituency of Poplar South. A small amount of the constituency's territory was added to Bow and Bromley.

It was re-established for the 1950 general election, and abolished again for the February 1974 general election.  It was then partly replaced by the new Stepney and Poplar constituency.

Boundaries

1885–1918: In 1885 the area was administered as part of the county of Middlesex. It was located in the Tower division, in the east of the historic county. The neighbourhood of Poplar formed a division of the parliamentary borough of Tower Hamlets. The parliamentary division was part of the East End of London.

In 1889 the Tower division of Middlesex was severed from the county, for administrative purposes. It became part of the County of London. In 1900 the lower tier of local government in London was re-modelled. Poplar constituency became part of the Metropolitan Borough of Poplar.

1950–1974: When a re-distribution of parliamentary seats took effect in 1950, the constituency was re-created. It then included the whole of the Metropolitan Borough of Poplar.

In 1965 the Metropolitan Borough was incorporated in the London Borough of Tower Hamlets in Greater London.

Members of Parliament

Election results

Elections in the 1880s

Elections in the 1890s

Elections in the 1900s

Elections in the 1910s

Elections in the 1950s

Elections in the 1960s

Elections in the 1970s

References

 Boundaries of Parliamentary Constituencies 1885-1972, compiled and edited by F.W.S. Craig (Parliamentary Reference Publications 1972)

Politics of the London Borough of Tower Hamlets
Parliamentary constituencies in London (historic)
Constituencies of the Parliament of the United Kingdom established in 1885
Constituencies of the Parliament of the United Kingdom disestablished in 1918
Constituencies of the Parliament of the United Kingdom established in 1950
Constituencies of the Parliament of the United Kingdom disestablished in 1974
Poplar, London